Mystic Seaport Museum or Mystic Seaport: The Museum of America and the Sea in Mystic, Connecticut is the largest maritime museum in the United States. It is notable for its collection of sailing ships and boats and for the re-creation of the crafts and fabric of an entire 19th-century seafaring village. It consists of more than 60 historic buildings, most of them rare commercial structures moved to the  site and meticulously restored.

Overview
The museum was established in 1929 as the "Marine Historical Association". Its fame came with the acquisition of the Charles W. Morgan in 1941, the only surviving wooden sailing whaler.  The Seaport was one of the first living history museums in the United States, with a collection of buildings and craftsmen to show how people lived; it now receives about 250,000 visitors each year.

The Seaport supports research via an extensive library and runs the Frank C. Munson Institute of American Maritime Studies, a summer graduate-level academic program established in 1955 by maritime historian Professor Robert G. Albion of Harvard University. The museum also hosts Williams–Mystic in conjunction with Williams College, an undergraduate program in maritime studies. Outreach includes sailing and history classes for area children.

Grounds and programs

The Preservation Shipyard is an important part of the museum, where traditional tools and techniques are used to preserve the Museum's collection of historic vessels, including the 1841 whaleship Charles W. Morgan. A replica of the slave ship La Amistad was constructed in the shipyard and launched in 2000. Amistad departed from New Haven on June 21, 2007 on a  transatlantic voyage to Great Britain, Lisbon, West Africa, and the Caribbean, marking the Atlantic trade and slave route to commemorate the 200th anniversary of the end of the slave trade in Great Britain.
 
The 19th-century seafaring village contains nearly all the types of general and specialized trades associated with building and operating a sailing fleet. They include a chandlery, sail loft, ropewalk, cooperage, shipping agent's office, printing office, bank, and others. Also included is The Spouter Tavern, which is open seasonally and serving "travelers' fare". Each building is used to show the original activity and also to display examples of what was sold or constructed; the nautical instrument shop, for example, displays sextants, nautical timepieces, and so forth, while demonstrations at the cooperage show how casks are assembled.

Additional buildings house more exhibits. Another contains a collection of carved ship figureheads. Also among the museum's buildings is a planetarium which demonstrates how seamen used stars for navigation.

Sailing instruction is also offered, as well as tourist rides in various historical small craft. Such tours give a good overview of historic ships at their moorings. Mystic Seaport's music program is unusual, as it prominently features sea shanties in their original contexts as work songs. The Mystic Seaport Sea Music Festival is held annually in June and is among the oldest and largest in the United States.

National Historic Landmarks
Four vessels at Mystic Seaport have been recognized by the United States Government as National Historic Landmarks

Other vessels

Gallery

See also
List of maritime museums in the United States
List of museum ships
Famous Sea Captain, Joseph Warren Holmes, many passings of Cape Horn
Whaleboat - examples shown are at Mystic Seaport

John Faunce Leavitt - former curator of Mystic Seaport.
 Theodore W. Houk - designer whose work is displayed

References
Notes

Bibliography
 Bray, Maynard; Fuller, Benjamin; and Vermilya, Peter (2002) Mystic Seaport Watercraft.

External links 

 Mystic Seaport homepage
 Mystic Seaport Podcast
 360-Degree Panoramic Photographs of Mystic Seaport

1929 establishments in Connecticut
Mystic, Connecticut
Stonington, Connecticut
Groton, Connecticut
Museums established in 1929
Museums in New London County, Connecticut
Maritime museums in Connecticut
Open-air museums in Connecticut
Living museums in Connecticut
Boat types
Marine art museums in the United States
Relocated buildings and structures in Connecticut
Ropewalks
Maritime culture